The Union Civil Service Board (abbreviated UCSB) is Burma's national civil service commission. It was formed on 28 October 2010 in accordance with the 2010 State Peace and Development Council Law. Its predecessor was the Public Service Commission (PSC), which was initially formed on 1 April 1937.

See also
 Ministry of Home Affairs

References

External links

Government agencies of Myanmar
National civil service commissions
2010 establishments in Myanmar
Government agencies established in 2010